Pisidium nitidum, the shining pea clam, is a species of minute freshwater clam, an aquatic bivalve mollusc in the family Sphaeriidae, the pea clams and fingernail clams.

Description
The 3 – 4 mm. shell is slightly tumid (swollen). In shape it is regular-oval with low umbos slightly behind the midpoint. The umbonal area is demarcated by three concentric furrows. The surface (periostracum)  is very glossy, with prominent irregularly spaced concentric striae. The colour is  yellowish.

Distribution
Its native distribution is Holarctic.

 Czech Republic – in Bohemia, in Moravia, - least concern (LC)
 Slovakia
 Germany – distributed in whole Germany, endangered (gefährdet) in Bavaria and Arten der Vorwarnliste in Brandenburg.
 Nordic countries: Denmark, Faroes, Finland, Iceland, Norway and Sweden
Great Britain and Ireland

References

External links
 Pisidium nitidum at Animalbase taxonomy,short description, biology,status (threats), images
Images at BOLD.
 Pisidium nitidum illustrated in Danmarks Fauna (Georg Mandahl-Barth)

nitidum
Bivalves described in 1832